Bloomfield is a city in Davis County, Iowa, United States. The population was 2,682 at the 2020 census.  It is the county seat of Davis County.

Geography
Bloomfield is located in the southeastern part of Iowa, near the Missouri border.
Bloomfield's longitude and latitude coordinates in decimal form are 40.751122, -92.417007.

Climate

According to the Köppen Climate Classification system, Bloomfield has a hot-summer humid continental climate, abbreviated "Dfa" on climate maps.

Demographics

2010 census
As of the census of 2010, there were 2,640 people, 1,122 households, and 683 families living in the city. The racial makeup of the city was 98.3% White, 0.2% African American, 0.2% Native American, 0.4% Asian, 0.2% from other races, and 0.8% from two or more races. Hispanic or Latino of any race were 1.5% of the population.

There were 1,122 households, of which 29.9% had children under the age of 18 living with them, 46.9% were married couples living together, 9.4% had a female householder with no husband present, 4.5% had a male householder with no wife present, and 39.1% were non-families. 34.8% of all households were made up of individuals, and 19.4% had someone living alone who was 65 years of age or older. The average household size was 2.27 and the average family size was 2.89.

The median age in the city was 43 years. 23.2% of residents were under the age of 18; 8.1% were between the ages of 18 and 24; 21% were from 25 to 44; 25.2% were from 45 to 64; and 22.7% were 65 years of age or older. The gender makeup of the city was 46.0% male and 54.0% female.

2000 census
As of the census of 2000, there were 2,601 people, 1,123 households, and 668 families living in the city. The racial makeup of the city was 98.54% White, 0.12% African American, 0.15% Native American, 0.19% Asian, 0.15% from other races, and 0.85% from two or more races. Hispanic or Latino of any race were 0.38% of the population.

There were 1,123 households, out of which 25.6% had children under the age of 18 living with them, 49.9% were married couples living together, 7.3% had a female householder with no husband present, and 40.5% were non-families. 36.0% of all households were made up of individuals, and 21.3% had someone living alone who was 65 years of age or older.  The average household size was 2.18 and the average family size was 2.84.

Age spread: 20.8% under the age of 18, 7.5% from 18 to 24, 23.8% from 25 to 44, 21.5% from 45 to 64, and 26.5% who were 65 years of age or older.  The median age was 43 years. For every 100 females, there were 82.0 males.  For every 100 females age 18 and over, there were 77.4 males.

The median income for a household in the city was $31,471, and the median income for a family was $44,073. Males had a median income of $25,260 versus $23,686 for females. The per capita income for the city was $17,962.  About 3.9% of families and 8.6% of the population were below the poverty line, including 11.3% of those under age 18 and 8.6% of those age 65 or over.

Education
The Davis County Community School District operates local area public schools.

Arts and culture

Annual events
The Davis County Fair is held in July every year at the fairgrounds, west of Bloomfield.

The week-long Davis County Country & Old Time Music Festival is held every September at the fairgrounds.

Bloomfield and Davis County have a large Amish population concentrated in nearby Drakesville.

Davis County Courthouse

The Davis County Courthouse was designed by Thomas J. Tolan & Son, Architects, of Fort Wayne Indiana and is situated on the Bloomfield townsquare. In November 1876, the center of the square was cleared of trees and the following June, Larkworthy & Menke, of Quincy, Illinois, was awarded the contract to supply stone. The bell was made by the Meneely & Kimberly Bell Company of Troy, New York. The clock was made by the Seth Thomas Company and still resides within the clock tower.  The building was completed in 1879. A chain surrounding the courthouse was added in 1879 and an iron fence, by the Cleveland Wrought Iron Fence Company, was added in 1881.

On August 27, 1924, Henry "Dare-Devil" Roland, "The Human Fly," attempted to climb the northwest corner of the courthouse. He fell to the ground from about 25 feet, breaking his hip. He was hospitalized in Bloomfield for six weeks, before returning east with his wife and daughter. On June 28, 1932, Roland made a return trip to Bloomfield to remove the blot from his record of successful climbs. This time, in just eleven minutes, he was sitting perched astride the statue of Blind Justice. Roland died October 7, 1937, as a result of a trapeze fall at Ottway, Tennessee.

The Davis County Court House was added to the National Register of Historic Places on May 3, 1974. The courthouse was photographed by Bob Thall as part of the Bicentennial project commissioned by Joseph E. Seagram & Sons, Inc. to document more than 1,100 American courthouses. One of the results of this project was the 1978 book Court House, edited by Richard Pare. Thall's photo was part of the project's traveling exhibition and also appeared in The New York Times Book Review, American Heritage and Newsweek magazines.

The Bloomfield Square Historic District, which surrounds the courthouse, was added to the National Register's listings on November 7, 1976.

The Davis County Courthouse Preservation Fund was incorporated in November 2005.

Historic Structures 

 The James B. Weaver House is a historic house at 102 Weaver Road (United States Route 63) in Bloomfield, Iowa. Built in 1865, it was the home of James Weaver (1833-1912) until 1890. Weaver, a populist and anti-monopolist, was the Greenback candidate for president in 1880 and the Populist candidate in 1892. The house was declared a National Historic Landmark in 1975.
 The William Findley House, also known as the Davis County Historical Society Museum, is a historic residence located in Bloomfield, Iowa, United States. Dr. William M. Findley was the first owner of this house. The T-shaped, vernacular structure is one of a very few brick houses in town, as the vast majority are frame construction. While it does not conform to any specific style, the wide, bracketed cornice does suggest the Italianate style. It was listed on the National Register of Historic Places in 1978.
 The Henry Wishard House, also known as the Fenton House, is a historic residence located in Bloomfield, Iowa, United States. Wishard was a prominent Bloomfield businessman, who was known as the father of the gasoline tax in the United States to raise revenue for road construction.  The house was listed on the National Register of Historic Places in 2004.

Infrastructure

Transportation
Bloomfield lies at the junction of U.S. Route 63 and Iowa Highway 2.

Notable people

Barry Davis (wrestler) - member of the 1984 and                   1988 Olympics winning silver in ‘84. 3 time National Champion at the University of Iowa. University of Wisconsin Head Coach 1994-2018
 Curt Bader - member of the 1988 and 1996 Olympic Kayak teams
 Clem Beauchamp - early motion picture actor, assistant director, production manager; Academy Award winner (Beau champ = Beautiful field...)
 Smith Wildman Brookhart - U.S. Senator
 Cyrus Bussey - Civil War Major General (Breveted); Assistant Secretary of the Interior
 Beryl F. Carroll - Governor of Iowa
 George W. Clarke - Governor of Iowa
 Samuel O. Dunn - journalist; transportation specialist
 Cora Bussey Hillis - Children's rights advocate
 L.D. Hotchkiss - former editor-in-chief, Los Angeles Times
 John A. Hull - Major General; Judge Advocate General of the Army (1924–1928); Associate Justice Supreme Court of the Philippines (1934–1936)
 John A.T. Hull - editor Davis County Republican; Iowa Secretary of State, Lt. Governor of Iowa, U.S. Representative
 Augustin Reed Humphrey - U.S. Representative from Nebraska
 John Henry Kyl - U.S. Representative 
 Jon Kyl - U.S. Senator from Arizona
 Irvin S. Pepper - U.S. Representative
 Bertha Eaton Raffetto - composer of Home Means Nevada, the state song of Nevada
 C. William Ramseyer - U.S. Representative
 Johnny Rawlings - major league baseball player (1914–1926); manager in All-American Girls Professional Baseball League
 Jack Reno - country singer, songwriter and disc jockey
 Kevin Ritz - major league pitcher, Detroit Tigers and Colorado Rockies
 Walter A. Sheaffer - founder of the Sheaffer Pen Company
 Erastus J. Turner - U.S. Representative from Kansas
 James Weaver - U.S. Representative; twice third-party presidential candidate, 1880 Greenback Party and 1892 Populist Party

References

External links

  
Official City Website
Bloomfield Main Street

 
Cities in Iowa
Cities in Davis County, Iowa
County seats in Iowa